Calytrix platycheiridia is a species of plant in the myrtle family Myrtaceae that is endemic to Western Australia.

It usually blooms in October producing yellow-cream star-shaped flowers.

Found on low ridges in a small area in the Wheatbelt region of Western Australia near Coorow where it grows on sandy soils.
 
The species was first formally described by the botanist Lyndley Craven in 1987 in the article A taxonomic revision of Calytrix Labill. (Myrtaceae) in the journal Brunonia.

References

Plants described in 1987
platycheiridia
Flora of Western Australia